Dapoury is a town in the Kayao Department of Bazèga Province in central Burkina Faso. The town has a population of 1,560.

References

External links
Satellite map at Maplandia.com

Populated places in the Centre-Sud Region
Bazèga Province